The 1998 TFL Statewide League premiership season was an Australian rules football competition, staged across Tasmania, Australia over eighteen roster rounds and six finals series matches between 4 April and 20 September 1998.

This was the thirteenth season of statewide football and the League was known as the Chickenfeed Super League under a commercial naming-rights sponsorship agreement with Chickenfeed Bargain Stores in Hobart worth A$350,000, with the Australian Football League also injecting a further A$1 million into Tasmanian football this season in a bid to lift the sport from its financial problems.
 
The North Launceston Robins renamed themselves as the Northern Bombers from this season and a new club, Southern Districts Cats were admitted into the competition from this season.

Participating Clubs
Burnie Dockers Football Club
Clarence District Football Club
Devonport Power Football Club
Glenorchy District Football Club
New Norfolk District Football Club
North Hobart Football Club
Northern Bombers Football Club
Southern Districts Football Club

TFL Club Debts
At the completion of the 1998 TFL Season it was disclosed as to the extent of the perilous financial situation the clubs in the competition had found themselves in.

The following is an official list of club debts released by the TFL to the Hobart Mercury.

Burnie Dockers ($735,819), Devonport ($709,067), New Norfolk ($431,858), Glenorchy ($267,897), North Hobart ($232,607), Northern Bombers ($167,570), Clarence ($153,441), Southern Districts ($80,000).

With the debt level continuing to rise, the League were continuing to raise the issue of cutbacks of participating clubs and changes to a possible Summer start in a bid to lift the flagging image of the TFL which was suffering from deep financial problems and poor attendances.

1998 TFL Statewide League Club Coaches
Darren Winter (Burnie Dockers)
Grant Fagan (Clarence)
Max Brown (Devonport Power)
Paul Hamilton (Glenorchy)
Rod Grinter & Craig Stevenson (New Norfolk)
John McCarthy (North Hobart)
Matthew Armstrong (Northern Bombers)
Troy Clarke (Southern Districts)

TFL Statewide League Reserves Grand Final
Burnie Dockers 11.19 (85) v Northern Bombers 10.9 (69) – North Hobart Oval

TFL Statewide League Colts (Under-19's) Grand Final
Clarence 10.13 (73) v Devonport Power 5.6 (36) – North Hobart Oval

Leading Goalkickers: TFL Statewide League
Ken Rainsford (Devonport Power) – 94
Michael McGregor (Southern Districts) – 59
Mark Colegrave (Clarence) – 58
Jason Gibson (Northern Bombers) – 56

Medal Winners
Wayne Weidemann (Devonport Power) – William Leitch Medal
Brendon Bolton (Northern Bombers) – Darrel Baldock Medal (Best player in TFL Grand Final)
Matthew Armstrong (Northern Bombers) – TFL Coaches Award
Nick Barnes (Burnie Dockers) – George Watt Medal (Reserves)
Chris Gracogna (Northern Bombers) – V.A Geard Medal (Under-19's)
Andrew McLean (Northern Bombers) & Errol Bourne (Burnie Dockers) – Lefroy Medal (Best player/s Interstate match)

Interstate Matches
Interstate Match (Saturday, 6 June 1998)
Tasmania 13.10 (88) v Victorian FL 6.17 (53) – Att: 2,532 at North Hobart Oval

1998 TFL Club Home Attendance Figures
Devonport: 16,585 for 9 matches at 1,842
Burnie Dockers: 16,273 for 9 matches at 1,808
Northern Bombers: 13,966 for 9 matches at 1,551
Clarence: 12,361 for 9 matches at 1,373
Southern Districts: 9,497 for 9 matches at 1,055
Glenorchy: 9,454 for 9 matches at 1,050
Nth Hobart: 8,494 for 9 matches at 943
New Norfolk: 7,706 for 9 matches at 856

1998 TFL Statewide League Ladder

Round 1
(Saturday, 4 April, Sunday, 5 April & Saturday, 11 April 1998)
Northern Bombers 20.16 (136) v New Norfolk 11.10 (76) – Att: 1,340 at York Park (4 April)
Nth Hobart 12.6 (78) v Southern Districts 9.19 (73) – Att: 1,558 at North Hobart Oval (5 April)
Burnie Dockers 13.10 (88) v Devonport 12.13 (85) – Att: 3,152 at Devonport Oval (5 April)
Clarence 18.4 (112) v Glenorchy 16.10 (106) – Att: 1,455 at Bellerive Oval (11 April)

Round 2
(Saturday, 18 April 1998)
Clarence 18.8 (116) v Nth Hobart 10.9 (69) – Att: 1,398 at North Hobart Oval
Northern Bombers 18.15 (123) v Glenorchy 9.13 (67) – Att: 1,161 at KGV Football Park
Devonport 21.10 (136) v New Norfolk 12.8 (80) – Att: 907 at Boyer Oval
Burnie Dockers 12.19 (91) v Southern Districts 8.12 (60) – Att: 2,251 at West Park Oval (Night)

Round 3
(Saturday, 25 April & Sunday, 26 April 1998)
Clarence 18.13 (121) v Southern Districts 14.12 (96) – Att: 1,510 at Bellerive Oval
Burnie Dockers 15.13 (103) v New Norfolk 8.11 (59) – Att: 846 at Boyer Oval (Sunday)
Northern Bombers 20.15 (135) v Nth Hobart 4.5 (29) – Att: 993 at York Park (Sunday)
Devonport 18.14 (122) v Glenorchy 14.8 (92) – Att: 1,537 at Devonport Oval (Sunday)

Round 4
(Saturday, 2 May & Sunday, 3 May 1998)
Nth Hobart 15.10 (100) v Devonport 14.8 (92) – Att: 654 at North Hobart Oval
Glenorchy 18.11 (119) v New Norfolk 13.9 (87) – Att: 1,530 at KGV Football Park
Burnie Dockers 11.15 (81) v Clarence 8.21 (69) – Att: 1,887 at West Park Oval
Northern Bombers 14.16 (100) v Southern Districts 11.10 (76) – Att: 912 at North Hobart Oval (Sunday)

Round 5
(Saturday, 9 May 1998)
Burnie Dockers 14.18 (102) v Glenorchy 10.9 (69) – Att: 817 at North Hobart Oval
Nth Hobart 13.9 (87) v New Norfolk 11.7 (73) – Att: 952 at Boyer Oval
Northern Bombers 16.12 (108) v Clarence 13.8 (86) – Att: 1,276 at York Park
Devonport 22.10 (142) v Southern Districts 6.9 (45) – Att: 1,044 at Devonport Oval

Round 6
(Saturday, 16 May & Sunday, 17 May 1998)
Clarence 30.21 (201) v New Norfolk 4.8 (32) – Att: 1,494 at Bellerive Oval
Burnie Dockers 18.17 (125) v Nth Hobart 11.11 (77) – Att: 1,425 at West Park Oval
Glenorchy 15.20 (110) v Southern Districts 16.8 (104) – Att: 2,038 at Huonville Recreation Ground (Sunday)
Northern Bombers 14.22 (106) v Devonport 5.9 (39) – Att: 2,149 at Devonport Oval (Sunday)

Round 7
(Saturday, 23 May & Sunday, 24 May 1998)
Southern Districts 27.20 (182) v New Norfolk 6.12 (48) – Att: 1,015 at North Hobart Oval
Clarence 16.17 (113) v Devonport 17.6 (108) – Att: 988 at Bellerive Oval
Northern Bombers 7.15 (57) v Burnie Dockers 5.9 (39) – Att: 2,024 at York Park
Nth Hobart 7.13 (55) v Glenorchy 7.10 (52) – Att: 1,335 at North Hobart Oval (Sunday)

Round 8
(Saturday, 30 May & Sunday, 31 May 1998)
Southern Districts 11.11 (77) v Nth Hobart 10.15 (75) – Att: 883 at North Hobart Oval
Clarence 11.18 (84) v Glenorchy 6.9 (45) – Att: 1,127 at KGV Football Park
Northern Bombers 17.10 (112) v New Norfolk 8.7 (55) – Att: 686 at Boyer Oval
Devonport 17.12 (114) v Burnie Dockers 12.8 (80) – Att: 3,275 at West Park Oval (Sunday)

Round 9
(Saturday, 13 June 1998)
Burnie Dockers 24.13 (157) v Southern Districts 8.6 (54) – Att: 754 at North Hobart Oval
Clarence 21.22 (148) v Nth Hobart 7.6 (48) – Att: 1,293 at Bellerive Oval
Northern Bombers 14.17 (101) v Glenorchy 10.5 (65) – Att: 1,138 at York Park
Devonport 19.12 (126) v New Norfolk 6.12 (48) – Att: 863 at Devonport Oval

Round 10
(Saturday, 20 June & Sunday, 21 June 1998)
Northern Bombers 17.12 (114) v Nth Hobart 9.11 (65) – Att: 890 at North Hobart Oval
Devonport 12.12 (84) v Glenorchy 11.11 (77) – Att: 788 at KGV Football Park
Burnie Dockers 20.14 (134) v New Norfolk 8.8 (56) – Att: 1,009 at West Park Oval
Clarence 20.17 (137) v Southern Districts 8.15 (63) – Att: 940 at North Hobart Oval (Sunday)

Round 11
(Saturday, 27 June 1998)
Burnie Dockers 20.9 (129) v Clarence 17.16 (118) – Att: 1,336 at Bellerive Oval
Glenorchy 11.18 (84) v New Norfolk 8.13 (61) – Att: 1,130 at Boyer Oval
Northern Bombers 20.18 (138) v Southern Districts 11.12 (78) – Att: 865 at York Park
Devonport 26.15 (171) v Nth Hobart 5.14 (44) – Att: 1,089 at Devonport Oval

Round 12
(Saturday, 4 July & Sunday, 5 July 1998)
Devonport 15.20 (110) v Southern Districts 15.7 (97) – Att: 613 at North Hobart Oval
Northern Bombers 15.8 (98) v Clarence 13.15 (93) – Att: 1,689 at Bellerive Oval
Burnie Dockers 14.15 (99) v Glenorchy 10.12 (72) – Att: 1,407 at West Park Oval
New Norfolk 14.12 (96) v Nth Hobart 10.19 (79) – Att: 971 at North Hobart Oval (Sunday)

Round 13
(Saturday, 11 July, Sunday, 12 July, Saturday, 18 July & Sunday, 19 July 1998)
Southern Districts 13.7 (85) v Glenorchy 11.16 (82) – Att: 1,018 at KGV Football Park (11 July)
Clarence 15.11 (101) v New Norfolk 9.6 (60) – Att: 962 at Boyer Oval (12 July)
Burnie Dockers 15.9 (99) v Nth Hobart 12.9 (81) – Att: 734 at North Hobart Oval (18 July)
Northern Bombers 15.10 (100) v Devonport 14.15 (99) – Att: 3,889 at York Park (19 July)

Round 14
(Saturday, 25 July & Sunday, 26 July 1998)
Glenorchy 19.11 (125) v Nth Hobart 13.10 (88) – Att: 1,173 at KGV Football Park
Southern Districts 17.17 (119) v New Norfolk 11.8 (74) – Att: 870 at Boyer Oval
Devonport 19.14 (128) v Clarence 14.18 (102) – Att: 1,501 at Devonport Oval
Northern Bombers 16.15 (111) v Burnie Dockers 15.8 (98) – Att: 2,599 at West Park Oval (Sunday)

Round 15
(Saturday, 1 August & Sunday, 2 August 1998)
Southern Districts 10.16 (76) v Nth Hobart 8.13 (61) – Att: 956 at North Hobart Oval
Clarence 17.11 (113) v Glenorchy 9.14 (68) – Att: 1,544 at Bellerive Oval
Northern Bombers 16.6 (102) v New Norfolk 12.11 (83) – Att: 849 at York Park
Devonport 15.6 (96) v Burnie Dockers 8.5 (53) – Att: 3,911 at Devonport Oval (Sunday)

Round 16
(Saturday, 8 August 1998)
Clarence 21.16 (142) v Nth Hobart 14.10 (94) – Att: 949 at North Hobart Oval
Northern Bombers 13.8 (86) v Glenorchy 10.10 (70) – Att: 955 at KGV Football Park
Devonport 25.17 (167) v New Norfolk 5.6 (36) – Att: 754 at Boyer Oval
Burnie Dockers 14.21 (105) v Southern Districts 12.13 (85) – Att: 1,205 at West Park Oval

Round 17
(Saturday, 15 August 1998)
Southern Districts 14.14 (98) v Clarence 12.12 (84) – Att: 1,052 at Bellerive Oval
Burnie Dockers 11.12 (78) v New Norfolk 8.7 (55) – Att: 599 at Boyer Oval
Northern Bombers 15.13 (103) v Nth Hobart 7.5 (47) – Att: 1,592 at York Park
Devonport 14.14 (98) v Glenorchy 11.10 (76) – Att: 1,339 at Devonport Oval

Round 18
(Saturday, 22 August & Sunday, 23 August 1998)
Devonport 21.18 (144) v Nth Hobart 4.4 (28) – Att: 680 at North Hobart Oval
Glenorchy 21.16 (142) v New Norfolk 5.8 (38) – Att: 885 at KGV Football Park
Clarence 5.8 (38) v Burnie Dockers 3.12 (30) – Att: 1,215 at West Park Oval
Northern Bombers 12.10 (82) v Southern Districts 6.8 (44) – Att: 711 at North Hobart Oval (Sunday)

Elimination Final
(Saturday, 29 August 1998)
Clarence Roos: 1.4 (10) | 8.10 (58) | 14.15 (99) | 19.18 (132)
Southern Districts: 2.2 (14) | 4.2 (26) | 5.5 (35) | 11.7 (73)
Attendance: 2,243 at North Hobart Oval

Qualifying Final
(Sunday, 30 August 1998)
Devonport Power: 2.1 (13) | 7.4 (46) | 8.8 (56) | 11.18 (84)
Burnie Dockers: 2.3 (15) | 4.4 (28) | 5.4 (34) | 8.5 (53)
Attendance: 5,576 at Devonport Oval

First Semi Final
(Saturday, 5 September 1998)
Clarence Roos: 7.2 (44) | 8.3 (51) | 13.5 (83) | 17.10 (112)
Burnie Dockers: 2.0 (12) | 5.4 (34) | 6.4 (40) | 11.6 (72)
Attendance: 2,041 at North Hobart Oval

Second Semi Final
(Sunday, 6 September 1998)
Northern Bombers: 3.3 (21) | 8.5 (53) | 8.8 (56) | 14.13 (97)
Devonport Power: 2.2 (14) | 3.4 (22) | 4.7 (31) | 6.8 (44)
Attendance: 3,892 at York Park

Preliminary Final
(Sunday, 13 September 1998)
Clarence Roos: 0.5 (5) | 4.7 (31) | 10.12 (72) | 12.13 (85)
Devonport Power: 3.3 (21) | 4.4 (28) | 4.6 (30) | 7.8 (50)
Attendance: 1,937 at North Hobart Oval

Grand Final
(Sunday, 20 September 1998)
Northern Bombers: 2.8 (20) | 5.11 (41) | 10.14 (74) | 14.16 (100)
Clarence Roos: 0.4 (4) | 0.8 (8) | 4.12 (36) | 6.15 (51)
Attendance: 9,638 at North Hobart Oval

Source: All scores and statistics courtesy of the Hobart Mercury, Launceston Examiner and North West Advocate publications.

Tasmanian Football League seasons